Arjomand District is in Firuzkuh County, Tehran province, Iran. At the 2006 National Census, its population was 8,380 in 2,309 households. The following census in 2011 counted 6,353 people in 2,120 households. At the latest census in 2016, the district had 6,502 inhabitants in 2,282 households.

References 

Firuzkuh County

Districts of Tehran Province

Populated places in Tehran Province

Populated places in Firuzkuh County